Albania competed at the 2019 Summer Universiade in Naples, Italy held from 3 to 14 July 2019.

Competitors 
The following is a list of the number of competitors representing Albania that participated at the Games:

Athletics 

Track & road events

Shooting 

Men

Taekwondo 

Men

References

External links 
 Official website

Nations at the 2019 Summer Universiade
Summer Universiade